Qiu Li (born June 6, 1981 in Shenyang, Liaoning, China) is a naturalised Chinese-Singaporean former professional association football player and current assistant coach of Shenyang Urban F.C.

Playing career

Club career 
Qiu started his senior career in Changchun Yatai and transferred to Liaoning Zhongyu in 2001. He was released by the club in 2005 as he was surplus to requirements.

Qiu was brought to Singapore to play for the S. League club, Sinchi FC, in 2005. After the club decided to pull out of the S-league for the 2006 season, he stayed in Singapore and agreed on a contract with the Young Lions where he excelled with 19 goals from 25 matches played. He joined Home United FC in 2007 but failed to find his form and joined Tampines Rovers FC in 2008. Impressive displays in his debuting two seasons earned him Singapore citizenship. In 2011, he joined Home United again and in 2013 he joined Balestier Khalsa after being released by Home United.

Qiu returned to Home United for the third time in 2014. However at the end of the season, he were released by the team again, and retired from playing professionally soon after.

International career 
Qiu made his debut for the Singapore national football team on 28 May 2008, in a friendly against Bahrain.

However, on 24 November 2008, FIFA banned Qiu from playing for Singapore because he did not meet the new criteria stating that a new citizen needs to reside in his new country for five years. Qiu Li had only lived in Singapore for three years. Thus he would be only eligible to represent Singapore in 2010. Singapore lost two games by forfeit (3–0) during 2010 World Cup qualifiers because Qiu was lined up.

Qiu Li was naturalised in 2010 under the Foreign Sports Talent Scheme and was eligible to play for Singapore in 2010 under FIFA rules.

On 23 July 2011, Qiu Li scored his first goal for Singapore in the first leg of the World Cup Qualifier against Malaysia played at a sold out crowd at Jalan Besar Stadium.

Coaching career 
After retirement from professional football, Qiu joined Liaoning Shenyang as a coach.

Honours

International
Singapore
AFF Championship: 2012

Club
Home United
 Singapore Cup: 2011

Balestier Khalsa
 League Cup: 2013

References

External links

1981 births
Living people
Footballers from Shenyang
Chinese footballers
Singaporean footballers
Singapore international footballers
Chinese emigrants to Singapore
Singaporean sportspeople of Chinese descent
Liaoning F.C. players
Changchun Yatai F.C. players
Naturalised citizens of Singapore
Association football forwards
Home United FC players
Tampines Rovers FC players
Balestier Khalsa FC players
Singapore Premier League players
Young Lions FC players